Silver Creek is a village in the Toledo District of Belize. According to the 2000 census, Silver Creek had a population of 1,326 people.  There is also a stream named Silver Creek at this same location. Near the village of Silver Creek is an ancient Maya civilization site.  Nearby there is a larger Maya site from at least as early as 700 AD, Lubaantun.

Reference line notes

External links
 Notice of new project for a bridge crossing of Silver Creek

Populated places in Toledo District